Shaken Not Stirred is the third studio album by American country music singer Phil Vassar. Released in 2004 on Arista Nashville, the album produced Vassar's second Number One single on the Billboard Hot Country Singles & Tracks (now Hot Country Songs) charts in the track "In a Real Love". The second single, "I'll Take That as a Yes (The Hot Tub Song)", reached number 17 on the country charts, while the third single ("Good Ole Days") peaked at number 22.

Vassar produced the entire album, working with Frank Rogers on tracks 1, 2, 4, 7, and 10, and Nick Brophy on the rest.

Track listing

Personnel
 Tim Akers – keyboards, organ, piano
 Nick Brophy – acoustic guitar, electric guitar
 Jim "Moose" Brown – clavinet, Hammond B-3 organ, keyboards, piano, Wurlitzer piano
 Robert Byrne – acoustic guitar 
 Angelo Collura – drums
 Eric Darken – percussion
 Shannon Forrest – drums
 Larry Franklin – fiddle
 Wes Hightower – background vocals 
 Jeff King – electric guitar 
 Steve Nathan – keyboards 
 Russ Pahl – electric guitar, steel guitar, slide guitar
 Clayton Ryder – keyboards, organ, piano 
 Jeff Smith – acoustic guitar, electric guitar, background vocals 
 Bryan Sutton – acoustic guitar, mandolin
 Russell Terrell – background vocals 
 Darren Theriault – bass guitar 
 Matt Thomas – fiddle, mandolin
 Julie Wood Vassar – background vocals 
 Phil Vassar – piano, synthesizer, vocal ad-libs, lead vocals, background vocals
 Craig Wiseman – vocal ad-libs
 Glenn Worf – bass guitar

Charts

Weekly charts

Year-end charts

References

2004 albums
Arista Records albums
Phil Vassar albums
Albums produced by Frank Rogers (record producer)